Queeny Tower, built in 1965 and named for Monsanto Company founder John Francis Queeny, is a former medical facility on the campus of Washington University School of Medicine. At , it is the third tallest medical-related building in the Western Hemisphere, as well as the second tallest building (after the Park East Tower) in St. Louis outside the downtown area. The building closed in November 2019 and demolition of the building began in March 2021 to make way for a new 7-story inpatient tower.

References
Queeny Tower profile on Skycraperpage
Queeny Tower profile on Emporis

Washington University in St. Louis
Skyscrapers in St. Louis
Washington University in St. Louis campus
Skyscrapers in Missouri
Buildings and structures in St. Louis
1965 establishments in Missouri
2019 disestablishments in Missouri